Shawn Morrison is an American television soap opera writer. During the writers' strike of 2007-08, he chose financial core status with the Writers Guild of America and continued working.

Positions held

Days of Our Lives
 Associate Head Writer (1995–1998)

Passions
 Script Editor (2007–2008)
 Outline Writer (2003–2007)
 Associate Head Writer (1999–2003)

Awards and nominations
Daytime Emmy Award
Nomination, 2003, Best Writing, Passions
Nomination, 2002, Best Writing, Passions
Nomination, 2001, Best Writing, Passions
Nomination, 1998, Best Writing, Days of our Lives
Nomination, 1997, Best Writing, Days of our Lives

Writers Guild of America Award
Nomination, 2000, Best Writing, Passions

External links

American soap opera writers
Year of birth missing (living people)
Living people